Jēkabpils is a state city in Jēkabpils Municipality in southeastern Latvia roughly halfway between Riga and Daugavpils and spanning the Daugava River. The name of the city literally translates into "Castle of Jacob". Historic Jēkabpils lies on the left bank, in Selonia while historic Krustpils lies on the right bank, in Latgale. The two cities were united during Soviet rule in 1962 under the Jēkabpils name, but retain their distinct regional character.

Jēkabpils was also formerly home to former Soviet Jēkabpils Air Base.

History

A stone cross-castle – Cruczeborch – was built in 1237 by the bishop of Rīga. Archeological excavations on the nearby Asote mound indicate that this place was a busy trading centre for the Latgalians, one of the Latvian tribes, and had been inhabited since 1000 BC. An adjoining settlement already existed when Krustpils Castle was first built; it grew up around the castle as the village of Krustpils. The village was often destroyed during local wars, such as Polish-Swedish battles, but was always rebuilt afterward.

During the 17th century persecuted Old Believers from Russia settled along the Daugava river. In 1670 this settlement, gradually growing around the Sala Inn, became known as Jēkabpils ( in German) in honor of the Duke of Courland, Jacob Kettler, who granted Magdeburg rights to the town.

A local legend about the town's origin states that the duke was hunting one day but became lost. At the Daugava River he simultaneously spotted a lynx underneath a fir tree as well as a town at the same time. This image of the lynx underneath a fir tree is the town's coat of arms.

In the period of the Duchy of Courland the residents of the town were mostly Russian Old believers, Poles and Lithuanians. Duke Jacob built a small port in the town to transport goods from a nearby iron foundry. At the end of 17th century there were an anchor mint, a gun foundry, lime and tar kilns and several other factories in Jacobstadt.
In 1704, during the Great Northern War, the town was occupied by the Russians. However, after few months a major battle, the (Battle of Jēkabpils), took place near the town. A Swedish army under Adam Lewenhaupt defeated a much larger Russian force and thus stopped Russian Empire from further invasion in the Duchy.
After the war and an epidemic of plague, the town again prospered. Barges from Belarus imported grain, honey, tobacco, spirits, textiles etc. At the same time land transport from Friedrichstadt amounted to approx. 9,000 cart loads a year during second half of the 18th century. Jacobstadt was also part of the postal road from Jelgava to Friedrichstadt and further to Ilūkste.

In 1764 the first ferry crossing to Krustpils was opened in the town. During the reign of Peter von Biron a small community of German-speaking craftsmen developed in the town besides Russians and Poles. Jews, however, were prohibited from entering the town. In 1795 Jacobstadt, like the whole Duchy of Courland and Semigallia, was incorporated into the Russian Empire.

In 1826 Friedrich Georg Wilhelm von Struve made his geodesic measurements near the town.
In 1834 the first hospital was opened in the town. During this period a theater and library were also opened and the first streets were cobbled.
In 1861 with the opening of the Riga–Daugavpils railway through Krustpils the role of the Daugava and barges as a main means of transport decreased. However the river was still used for timber rafting.

At the turn of the 20th century there were a bank, an insurance company, a match factory, a steam mill, a brewery, typography and several other enterprises. During the First World War heavy battles were fought around the town and some 280 buildings in the town were destroyed or damaged.

In 1919 Jēkabpils became the administrative centre of the newly established Jaunjelgava district. In 1932 a sugar refinery was built in the town. In 1936 a bridge was built over the Daugava. In this way Jēkabpils and Krustpils were united for the first time.
During the Second World War the bridge was blown up. A new bridge was constructed only in 1962.

Jēkabpils and Krustpils were merged in 1962 under the name Jēkabpils. During the Soviet period the united city was home to several big factories. Among them were the sewing enterprise Asote, the dolomite splinter mine Dolomīts, a reinforced concrete construction factory, a dairy processing plant and several other enterprises.
After the restoration of Latvian independence in 1991 many factories went bankrupt or production was drastically reduced.

From 2009 to 2021, the city, while being a separate first-level municipality (republican city, republikas pilsēta), was also the extraterritorial center of Jēkabpils Municipality. Since 2021, it retains state city status, but does not have a separate first-level local government.

Geography
The population of Jēkabpils town is 29,100. The two historical parts of Jēkabpils — Krustpils and historic Jēkabpils — are connected by the bridge across the Daugava River.

Demographics
As of 1 January 2017, the city had a population of 23,750.

Sights

Jēkabpils
In the older parts of the city, some buildings have been preserved.
The castle of Krustpils houses the History Museum of Jēkabpils and Krustpils.

Jēkabpils District
One of the Struve Geodetic Arc original station points is located in Strūves park. In Tadenava, not far from Jēkabpils itself, there is a memorial museum to the great Latvian poet Rainis. Nearby are also the castle of Justine and Dignāja. The highest point of Selonia — Ormaņkalns is in the vicinity of Klauce. Between Nereta and Aknīste there is a museum "Riekstiņi" commemorating the famous Latvian writer Jānis Jaunsudrabiņš.

Notable people
 Reinis Nitišs, World Rallycross driver

Twin towns – sister cities

Jēkabpils is twinned with:

 Czerwionka-Leszczyny, Poland
 Lida, Belarus
 Maardu, Estonia
 Melle, Germany
 Myrhorod, Ukraine
 Qaraçuxur, Azerbaijan
 Rokiškis, Lithuania
 Sokołów Podlaski, Poland

Gallery

References

 
Cities in Latvia
Republican cities of Latvia
Jēkabpils Municipality